Joseph Crowe may refer to:
 Joseph Petrus Hendrik Crowe (1826–1876), South African recipient of the Victoria Cross
 Joseph Archer Crowe (1825–1896), English consular official and art critic

See also
Joseph Crow (disambiguation)